Anonymous is the fifth album by Tyske Ludder, released 3 years after their fourth, Sojus. It contains the same line-up used in their previous album.

Track listing
All tracks by Tyske Ludder

 "Frya Frisena" – 5:07
 "Shokkz" – 5:20
 "Gebet" – 5:30
 "Psychoaktiv" – 5:03
 "Fix The Beat" – 5:45
 "Bastard" – 4:17
 "Narben" – 5:44
 "Panzer" – 4:50
 "March" – 5:12
 "Maschinenstaat" – 5:13

Personnel 

Claus Albers – vocals
Olaf A. Reimers – keyboards, producer, electronics
Ralf Homann – drums, hand percussion
Sebastian Hartmann - producer, engineer

2009 albums
Tyske Ludder albums